Boomerang is the third album by Betty Boo, self-released on 14 October 2022. It was announced on 29 June 2022. The album peaked at number 45 on the UK Albums Chart.

Reception

Retro Pop Magazine wrote that "Betty Boo doesn't miss a beat as she bounces back with Boomerang", elaborating: "It's a nod to the past that touches on Betty Boo's career beginnings while placing her sound firmly in 2022, with an overarching sense of nostalgia that's in line with current chart trends."

Sal Cinquemani of Slant Magazine felt that "While it's adeptly produced and mixed, Boomerang lacks the bite of Clarkson's underrated debut, Boomania, whose cartoonish pop-rap was shrewdly tempered by sleek, unassuming house tracks."

Track listing
 "Get Me to the Weekend" – 3:18
 "Shining Star" – 3:18
 "Miracle" (featuring Chuck D) – 3:34
 "Right by Your Side" (featuring David Gray) – 3:09
 "Boomerang" – 2:45
 "Nobody Can Bring Me Down" – 3:10
 "Stop Your Nonsense (Bubblegum Pop!)" – 3:26
 "Never Too Late" – 3:50
 "All I Wanna Do Is Dance" – 3:26
 "808" – 2:24
 "Superstar" – 3:28
 "Hell Yeah" – 3:19
CD and digital download bonus tracks
"Shining Star" (featuring Sophie Ellis-Bextor) – 3:18
"S.O.S." – 3:40
 "Bright Lights" – 3:26
 "Get Me to the Weekend" (original extended mix) – 4:34
 "Right by Your Side" (featuring David Gray; extended mix) – 5:09
 "Miracle" (extended mix) – 5:16
Digital download bonus tracks
"Doin' the Do '22" – 4:06
 "Where Are You Baby? '22" – 2:44
Digital download deluxe edition bonus tracks
"Get Me to the Weekend" (original extended mix) – 4:35
"Shining Star" (extended mix) – 5:02
"Miracle" (featuring Chuck D) (extended mix) – 5:16
"Right by Your Side" (featuring David Gray) (extended mix) – 5:09
"Boomerang" (extended mix) – 4:52
"Nobody Can Bring Me Down" (extended mix) – 5:35
"Stop Your Nonsense (Bubblegum Pop!)" (extended mix) – 5:15
"Never Too Late" (extended mix) – 5:11
"All I Wanna Do Is Dance" (extended mix) – 5:19
"808" (extended mix) – 3:54
"Superstar" (extended mix) – 5:37
"Hell Yeah" (extended mix) – 5:05
"Shining Star" (featuring Sophie Ellis-Bextor) – 3:19
"S.O.S." – 3:40
"Bright Lights" – 3:26
"Doin' the Do '22" – 4:06
"Where Are You Baby? '22" – 2:45

Personnel
Backing Vocals – Andy Wright (tracks: A3, A4, B5), Betty Boo, Gavin Goldberg (tracks: A4, B1), Shean Williams (tracks: B6)
Guitar, Bass, Keyboards – Andy Wright, Gavin Goldberg
Illustration [Cover Illustrations By] – Tom Kennedy (25)
Layout [Design Layout] – Greg Jakobek
Lead Vocals, Recorded By [Vocals Recorded At Home By] – Betty Boo
Mastered By – JP
Photography By [Photo] – Sandro Hyams
Producer – Andy Wright, Betty Boo, Gavin Goldberg
Producer [Assisted By] – Lewis Chapman
Vocals – Chuck D, David Gray, Sophie Ellis-Bextor

Charts

References

External links

2022 albums
Betty Boo albums